Quantum Guitar is an instrumental progressive rock album released by Steve Howe in 1998. Howe uses several different guitars, acoustic and electric.

Track listing
All tracks composed by Steve Howe, except where indicated.

"Walk Don't Run" (Johnny Smith) – 3:03
"The Collector" – 3:02
"Light Walls" (Howe, Keith West) – 3:45
"Mosaic" – 2:03
"Suddenly"  – 10:11
"Country Viper"  – 1:40
"Mainland" – 3:30
"Knights of Carmelite"  – 3:02
"Paradox" – 4:55
"Momenta"  – 2:57
"Sleep Walk" (Santo, Johnny & Ann Farina) – 3:13
"Sovereigns"  – 2:13
"Totality" – 2:24
"Solid Ground" – 5:27
"The Great Siege"  – 2:17
"Cacti Garden" – 2:25
"Southern Accent" – 4:12

Musicians
Steve Howe - guitars
Dylan Howe - drums

References

Steve Howe (musician) albums
1998 albums